Bydgoszcz Ignacy Jan Paderewski Airport  is a Polish regional airport in the city of Bydgoszcz, Poland. It lies only  from the city centre and around 50 km from the city of Toruń. It is the eleventh largest airport in Poland in terms of passenger traffic. The airport served 413,245 passengers in 2018.

Airlines and destinations
The following airlines operate regular scheduled and charter flights at Bydgoszcz Ignacy Jan Paderewski Airport:

Statistics

See also
 List of airports in Poland
 Air ambulances in Poland

References

External links 

  

Airports in Poland
Buildings and structures in Bydgoszcz
Transport in Bydgoszcz